Donna Gigliotti is an American film producer. She is best known for producing Shakespeare in Love, Hidden Figures, Silver Linings Playbook and The Reader. 

Gigliotti started her professional career as an assistant to Martin Scorsese on the film Raging Bull. During the 1990s Gigliotti worked as an executive-producer on several films including Emma, Talk of Angels and Devil in a Blue Dress.

She is president of the production company Tempesta Films, and has produced movies including The Fundamentals of Caring and Hidden Figures, and is executive producer of films including Beasts of No Nation. In 2019 she produced the 91st Academy Awards telecast on ABC. She is an Associate Arts Professor in the New York University Tisch School of the Arts.

Filmography
She was a producer in all films unless otherwise noted.

Film

Miscellaneous crew

Thanks

Television

Awards and nominations
Academy Awards
1998: Best Picture (for Shakespeare in Love, won)
2008: Best Picture (for The Reader, nominated)
2012: Best Picture (for Silver Linings Playbook, nominated)
2016: Best Picture (for Hidden Figures, nominated) 

BAFTA Awards
1998: Best Film (for Shakespeare in Love, won)
2008: Best Film (for The Reader, nominated)

Primetime Emmy Awards
2019: Outstanding Variety Special (Live) (for 91st Academy Awards, nominated)

Producers Guild of America (PGA)
1998: Motion Picture Producer of the Year Award (for Shakespeare in Love, nominated)

References

External links

1955 births
American film producers
Living people
Filmmakers who won the Best Film BAFTA Award
Golden Globe Award-winning producers
Producers who won the Best Picture Academy Award